Tissue kallikrein (glandular kallikrein, pancreatic kallikrein, submandibular kallikrein, submaxillary kallikrein, kidney kallikrein, urinary kallikrein, kallikrein, salivary kallikrein, kininogenin, kininogenase, callicrein, glumorin, padreatin, padutin, kallidinogenase, bradykininogenase, depot-padutin, urokallikrein, dilminal D, onokrein P) is an enzyme. This enzyme catalyses the following chemical reaction

 Preferential cleavage of Arg- bonds in small molecule substrates. It acts highly selectively to release kallidin (lysyl-bradykinin) from kininogen

This enzyme is formed from tissue prokallikrein by activation with trypsin.

See also 
 Kallikrein

References

External links 
 

EC 3.4.21